Togo competed at the 1996 Summer Olympics in Atlanta, United States.  The flag bearer was Téko Folligan.

Athletics

Men
Track & road events

References
Official Olympic Reports

Nations at the 1996 Summer Olympics
1996
Summer Olympics